The Marine Products Export Development Authority (MPEDA) is a Government of India company headquartered at Kochi. It was constituted on 24 August 1972, under the Marine Products Export Development Authority Act 1972 (No.13 of 1972). The role envisaged for the MPEDA under the statute is comprehensive - covering fisheries of all kinds, increasing exports, specifying standards, processing, marketing, extension and training in various aspects of the industry.

MPEDA functions under the Department of Commerce, Government of India and acts as a coordinating agency with different Central and State Government establishments engaged in fishery production and allied activities.

Services offered by MPEDA
  Registration of infrastructure facilities for Seafood Export trade
  Collection and dissemination of trade information 
  Projection of Indian marine products in overseas markets by participation in overseas fairs and organising international seafood fairs in India
  Implementation of development measures vital to the industry like distribution of insulated  fish boxes, putting up  fish landing platforms, improvement of peeling sheds, modernisation of industry such as upgrading of plate freezers, installation of IQF machinery, generator sets, ice making machineries, quality control laboratory etc. 
  Promotion of brackish water aquaculture for production of prawn for export
  Promotion of deep sea fishing projects through test fishing, joint venture and equity participation

References

Companies based in Kochi
Fishing industry
Fishing in India
Export promotion agencies of India
1972 establishments in Kerala
Government agencies established in 1972